Miss World Malaysia 2021, the 53rd edition of the Miss World Malaysia pageant was held virtually on October 16, 2021, due to the COVID-19 pandemic.
 The pageant was air virtually on a new interactive online TV platform HyperLive. Preliminary event was held on October 2, 2021. The pageant was a collaboration with Sabah Tourism Board and Sabah Association of Tour and Travel Agents (SATTA) to promote Sabah as a tourist destination in a unique way and produce highly engaging tourism-related live variety shows hosted by Malaysian beauty queens.

39 contestants from all across Malaysia competed for the title. Miss World Malaysia 2019, Alexis Sue-Ann crowned her successor, Lavanya Sivaji at the end of the event. The official crown ceremony was held on November 1, 2021, at Ceres Jewels in Kuala Lumpur. She represented Malaysia at Miss World 2021 which was held in San Juan, Puerto Rico.

Results 

Notes:

§ – placed into the Top 12 by fast-track challenges (Beauty with a Purpose, Head to Head Challenge and Miss Talent Award)

Special awards

Contestants 
39 contestants competed in the preliminary but only 37 contestants competed in the finale.

References

External links 

 Official Miss World Malaysia Website
 

2021 in Malaysia
2021 beauty pageants
2021
October 2021 events in Malaysia